Page One may refer to:

Page One (bookstore), a bookstore chain and publisher founded in Singapore
Page One (Joe Henderson album), a 1963 album by Joe Henderson
Page One (Steven Page album), a 2010 album by Steven Page
Page One Records, a 1960s UK record label
Page One: Inside the New York Times, a 2011 documentary film about The New York Times
"Page One" (song) by Katie Noonan, 2010